Colin Casey (born 10 March 1949) is an Australian former rugby league footballer who played in the 1970s.

Col Casey was a Newtown junior, who came through the ranks to play for the Newtown Jets for nine seasons, and became the Newtown club captain in the late 1970s. Col Casey was a tough forward, who was a favourite of all Newtown fans during his long career. He won the reserve grade premiership with Newtown in 1970, and featured in many great performances for the club over the years. He retired from Newtown in 1979 and took up a captain-coach position at Campbelltown, New South Wales.

In 1982-83 Casey coached Woy Woy, with the side winning the minor premiership but losing the grand final to Wyong in his first season.

References

1949 births
Living people
Newtown Jets players
Australian rugby league coaches
Australian rugby league players
Rugby league props
Rugby league players from Sydney